Major General Rao Farman Ali  (January 1, 1922 – 20 January 2004) was a Major General in Pakistan Army,  and political figure who is widely considered  a key architect of the 1971 Bangladesh genocide the Bangladesh Liberation War.

Commissioned in September, 1943 as a forward observer in Regiment of Artillery, he served as military adviser to the Pakistan army, and oversaw the deployment of military police aided with local militias (razarkars) during the Bangladesh Liberation War. He testified his responsibilities in the Hamoodur Rahman Commission in 1972 but denied allegations of genocide committed in Bangladesh in spite of the Hamoodur Rahman Commission which proved the involvement of misconducts and genocide of Pakistani military personnel.

Upon being forced to retire, he joined the Fauji Foundation as an agronomist, and founded the Fauji Fertilizer Company Limited in 1978. From 1985–88, he served as petroleum minister and National Security Advisor in President Zia-ul-Haq's administration, and went into hiding after Zia's death.

Biography
Rao Farman Ali was born into a Haryanvi Ranghar Rajput family in Rohtak, East Punjab, then under the British Colonial rule in 1923. His date of birth is read as 1 January 1923, according to the official headstone written in Urdu in his grave which is located in the Westridge cemetery in Rawalpindi. Very little is known about his early life in the literature based on Pakistani military, and not much is published about his educational background.

He gained his commission as a second lieutenant in the Regiment of Artillery of the British Indian Army and participated in World War II in 1943. At the partition of British India in 1947, he opted for the Pakistan Army and joined the Military Police. His military career saw his repeated deployment in East Pakistan as a political adviser and later ascended as military adviser to East Pakistan Army. In the 1960s, Farman was posted at the Army GHQ. He served there in the Directorate of Military Operations and as the Director, Military Training.

It is not known if Rao took participation in war with India in 1965, since he was stationed in East. In 1967, he was again stationed in East as an officer commanding of the 14th Battalion; he was posted again and sent back to West. In 1969, President Ayub Khan handed over the presidency to his Commander-in-Chief General Yahya Khan who posted Ali upon the request of Major-General Muzaffaruddin– the martial law administrator of East Pakistan.

The posting came at the behest of the East Pakistani government requesting him due to his experiences in East. He was the military adviser to the East Pakistan Army and elevated as the Defence Secretary of the East Pakistani government, serving from 1969–71. He enjoyed full support of President Yahya Khan serving under several governors and oversaw various civil affairs in the government.757-759 He helped raise the paramilitary units such as the Volunteers (Razakars), Peace Committee, Al Badr, and Al Shams to aid the genocide of the Pakistan army.

In 1971, when the talks with Awami League failed, Ali along with Lieutenant-General Tikka Khan launched the military crackdown on the people of erstwhile East Pakistan under direction of President Yahya Khan. Ali is held responsible for widespread genocide and massacre took place in Dhaka University. Hamoodur Rahman Commission though heavily criticized other senior military staff of Pakistan Army in East Pakistan at the time including confirmation of mass atrocities, cleared Ali citing the fact that he was not involved in any direct Military Operation due to the nature of his post which was mostly Administrative.

Altaf Gohar, an East Pakistani civil servant, recounted an incident from his memory that a hit list had been drawn up for elimination of certain Bangalis. A friend of Altaf Gohar was also in the list and his friends and relatives requested Gohar if he could do something to save his friend.  Gohar held a meeting with Farman and requested him to drop the name from his hit list. " Farman took, said Gohar, a diary out of his drawer and crossed the name out. The name was of Mr. Sanaul Huq and he was spared."

Pages of this very diary with lists of intellectuals were recovered from the debris of Rao Farman's office, the then Governor's House, which was bombed by Indian Air Force on 14 December.A note book was found in Rao farman Ali's office in Dhaka, One page contained a list of university teachers with addresses, with tick marks besides some of the names like "M. Haider Chy. Bangali" or "Saduddin-Sociology, 16-D, UQ" (university quarter). It is up to the readers to find out the reality of this page, and the meaning of the marks, bearing in mind that the last entry was most probably on 13 December.

After the civil war in 1971 ended, Farman's diary was recovered from the ruins of the Governor's house. The copy of a page from the diary shows the list of intellectuals from Dhaka University. Out of which, 14 of them were killed on 14 December 1971. In 1971, he, along with Lieutenant-General Amir Abdullah Khan Niazi, sent a telegram to the U.S. Embassy in Dacca  to transmit the surrender proposal to New Delhi. Farman Ali also sent a request for a cease-fire to the United Nations, but it was quickly countermanded by a message from President Yahya Khan which described Farman Ali's request as "unauthorized".

About the Bangladesh Liberation War, General A.A.K. Niazi maintained that Farman requested the latter on multiple occasions to stationed him back to Pakistan after the Farman's gained notoriety over his involvement in the killing of the intellectuals. A.A.K. Niazi wrote in his book, "The Betrayal of East Pakistan that Farman had quoted: "Mukti Bahini would kill him of his alleged massacre of the Bangalees and intellectuals on the night of 15–16 December. It was a pathetic sight to see him pale and almost on the verge of break down." He is also alleged to have written in his Diary as: "Green Land of East Pakistan will be painted Red." However, Farman Ali had denied all the accusations leveled against him, and branded these accusations as "lies."

In 1972, Ali testified against A.A.K. Niazi in the Hamoodur Rahman Commission and noted that Niazi's morale collapsed as early as 7 December and cried fanatically over the progress report presented to the Abdul Motaleb Malik. Controversy regarding his own involvement in the political events of East had arisen since he had denied all accusations leveled against him despite testifying his responsibilities as military adviser to East Pakistani military command.

Farman Ali was forcefully retired from the military in 1972 but appointed as Managing Director of Fauji Foundation in 1974 which he remained in that position until 1984. He served as an agronomist at the Fauji Foundation and helped create the chemical fertilizer and served its first director of the Fauji Fertilizer Company in 1978. In 1985, he was appointed as Minister of Petroleum and Natural Resources and National Security Advisor in President Zia-ul-Haq's administration, which he served until 1988.

After sudden death of President Zia-ul-Haq, Farman Ali reportedly went into hiding and lived a very quiet life in Rawalpindi on a pension. Throughout the 1990s, he fought a brief illness and authored a book, Sar Gazisht, based on the East Pakistan crises. On 20 January 2004, Farman Ali died and was laid to rest with military honors in Westridge cemetery in Rawalpindi, Punjab, Pakistan.

Awards and decorations

Foreign decorations

See also
 Bangladesh Liberation War
 1971 killing of Bengali intellectuals

References

External links
 Rao Farman Ali passes away
 Interview of Rao Farman Ali

1922 births
2004 deaths
British Indian Army officers
Causes and prelude of the Bangladesh Liberation War
Controversies in Pakistan
Generals of the Bangladesh Liberation War
Generals of the Indo-Pakistani War of 1971
Indian Army personnel of World War II
Indian military personnel of World War II
Pakistani agronomists
Pakistani generals
Pakistani people of Haryanvi descent
Pakistani prisoners of war
People of the Bangladesh Liberation War
People of East Pakistan
People from Rohtak
1971 controversies
1971 Bangladesh genocide perpetrators
20th-century agronomists